Maru (also Romanized as Mārū) is a village in Kohurestan Rural District, in the Central District of Khamir County, Hormozgan Province, Iran. At the 2006 census, its population was 269, in 61 families.

References 

Populated places in Khamir County